Brian Russell De Palma (born September 11, 1940) is an American film director and screenwriter. With a career spanning over 50 years, he is best known for his work in the suspense, crime and psychological thriller genres. De Palma was a leading member of the New Hollywood generation of film directors. 
His direction often makes use of quotations from other films or cinematic styles, and bears the influence of filmmakers such as Alfred Hitchcock and Jean-Luc Godard. 

His films have been criticized for their violence and sexual content but have also been championed by American critics such as Roger Ebert and Pauline Kael. His films include mainstream box office hits such as Carrie (1976), Dressed to Kill (1980), Scarface (1983), The Untouchables (1987), and Mission: Impossible (1996), as well as cult favorites such as Sisters (1972), Phantom of the Paradise (1974), Blow Out (1981), Casualties of War (1989), and Carlito's Way (1993).

Early life
De Palma was born on September 11, 1940, in Newark, New Jersey, the youngest of three boys. His Italian-American parents were Vivienne DePalma (née Muti), and Anthony DePalma, an orthopedic surgeon who was the son of immigrants from Alberona, Province of Foggia. He was raised in Philadelphia, Pennsylvania, and New Hampshire, and attended various Protestant and Quaker schools, eventually graduating from Friends' Central School. He had a poor relationship with his father, and would secretly follow him to record his adulterous behavior; this would eventually inspire the teenage character played by Keith Gordon in De Palma's 1980 film Dressed to Kill. When he was in high school, he built computers. He won a regional science-fair prize for a project titled "An Analog Computer to Solve Differential Equations".

Career

1960s and early career
Enrolled at Columbia University as a physics student, De Palma became enraptured with the filmmaking process after viewing Citizen Kane and Vertigo. After receiving his undergraduate degree in 1962, De Palma enrolled at the newly coed Sarah Lawrence College as a graduate student in their theater department, earning an M.A. in the discipline in 1964 and becoming one of the first male students among a female population. Once there, influences as various as drama teacher Wilford Leach, the Maysles brothers, Michelangelo Antonioni, Jean-Luc Godard, Andy Warhol, and Alfred Hitchcock impressed upon De Palma the many styles and themes that would shape his own cinema in the coming decades.

An early association with a young Robert De Niro resulted in The Wedding Party. The film, which was co-directed with Leach and producer Cynthia Munroe, had been shot in 1963 but remained unreleased until 1969, when De Palma's star had risen sufficiently within the Greenwich Village filmmaking scene. De Niro was unknown at the time; the credits mistakenly display his name as "Robert ". The film is noteworthy for its invocation of silent film techniques and an insistence on the jump-cut for effect. De Palma followed this style with various small films for the NAACP and the Treasury Department.

During the 1960s, De Palma began making a living producing documentary films, notably The Responsive Eye, a 1966 movie about The Responsive Eye op-art exhibit curated by William Seitz for MOMA in 1965. In an interview with Joseph Gelmis from 1969, De Palma described the film as "very good and very successful. It's distributed by Pathe Contemporary and makes lots of money. I shot it in four hours, with synched sound. I had two other guys shooting people's reactions to the paintings, and the paintings themselves."

Dionysus in '69 (1969) was De Palma's other major documentary from this period. The film records the Performance Group's performance of Euripides' The Bacchae, starring, amongst others, De Palma regular William Finley. The play is noted for breaking traditional barriers between performers and audience. The film's most striking quality is its extensive use of the split-screen. De Palma recalls that he was "floored" by this performance upon first sight, and in 1973 recounts how he "began to try and figure out a way to capture it on film. I came up with the idea of split-screen, to be able to show the actual audience involvement, to trace the life of the audience and that of the play as they merge in and out of each other."

De Palma's most significant features from this decade are Greetings (1968) and Hi, Mom! (1970). Both films star Robert De Niro and espouse a leftist revolutionary viewpoint common to the era in which they were released. Greetings was entered into the 19th Berlin International Film Festival, where it won a Silver Bear award. His other major film from this period is the slasher comedy Murder a la Mod. Each of these films experiments with narrative and intertextuality, reflecting De Palma's stated intention to become the "American Godard" while integrating several of the themes which permeated Hitchcock's work.

1970s: transition to Hollywood
In 1970, De Palma left New York for Hollywood at age thirty to make Get to Know Your Rabbit, starring Orson Welles and Tommy Smothers. Making the film was a crushing experience for De Palma, as Smothers did not like many of De Palma's ideas.

After several small, studio and independently-released films that included stand-outs Sisters, Phantom of the Paradise, and Obsession, De Palma directed a film adaptation of the 1974 novel Carrie by Stephen King. Though some see the psychic thriller as De Palma's bid for a blockbuster, the project was in fact small, underfunded by United Artists, and well under the cultural radar during the early months of production, as the source novel had yet to climb the bestseller list. De Palma gravitated toward the project and changed crucial plot elements based upon his own predilections, not the saleability of the novel. The cast was young and relatively new, though Sissy Spacek and John Travolta had gained attention for previous work in, respectively, film and episodic sitcoms. Carrie became De Palma's first genuine box-office success, garnering Spacek and Piper Laurie Oscar nominations for their performances. Pre-production for the film had coincided with the casting process for George Lucas's Star Wars, and many of the actors cast in De Palma's film had been earmarked as contenders for Lucas's movie, and vice versa. The "shock ending" finale is effective even while it upholds horror-film convention, its suspense sequences are buttressed by teen comedy tropes, and its use of split-screen, split-diopter and slow motion shots tell the story visually rather than through dialogue. As for Lucas' project, De Palma complained in an early viewing of Star Wars that the opening text crawl was poorly written and volunteered to help edit the text to a more concise and engaging form.

The financial and critical success of Carrie allowed De Palma to pursue more personal material. The Demolished Man was a novel that had fascinated De Palma since the late 1950s and appealed to his background in mathematics and avant-garde storytelling. Its unconventional unfolding of plot (exemplified in its mathematical layout of dialogue) and its stress on perception have analogs in De Palma's filmmaking. He sought to adapt it numerous times, though the project would carry a substantial price tag, and has yet to appear on-screen (Steven Spielberg's 2002 adaptation of Philip K. Dick's Minority Report bears striking similarities to De Palma's visual style and some of the themes of The Demolished Man). The result of his experience with adapting The Demolished Man was the 1978 science fiction psychic thriller film The Fury, starring Kirk Douglas, Carrie Snodgress, John Cassavetes and Amy Irving. The film was admired by Jean-Luc Godard, who featured a clip in his mammoth Histoire(s) du cinéma, and Pauline Kael, who championed both The Fury and De Palma. The film boasted a larger budget than Carrie, though the consensus view at the time was that De Palma was repeating himself, with diminishing returns. As a film, it retains De Palma's considerable visual flair, but points more toward his work in mainstream entertainments such as Mission: Impossible, the thematic complex thriller for which he is now better known.

1980s and breakthrough
The 1980s were marked by some of De Palma's best known films including Dressed to Kill (1980), Blow Out (1981), Scarface (1983), Body Double (1984), and The Untouchables (1987). In 1984, he directed the music video for Bruce Springsteen's single "Dancing in the Dark".

1990s - 2000s: career downturn

De Palma's career continued over the next two decades with films in a variety of genres. The Bonfire of the Vanities (1990) was a notorious failure with both critics and audiences but De Palma had subsequent successes with Raising Cain (1992) and Carlito's Way (1993) with Mission: Impossible (1996) becoming his highest grossing film and starting a successful franchise.

De Palma's work after Mission: Impossible has been less well received. His ensuing films Snake Eyes (1998), Mission to Mars (2000), and Femme Fatale (2002) all failed at the box office and received generally poor reviews, though Femme Fatale has since been revived in the eyes of many film critics and became a cult classic.  His 2006 adaptation of The Black Dahlia was also unsuccessful and is currently the last movie De Palma has directed with backing from Hollywood.

A political controversy erupted over the portrayal of US soldiers in De Palma's 2007 film Redacted. Loosely based on the 2006 Mahmudiyah killings by American soldiers in Iraq, the film echoes themes that appeared in De Palma's Vietnam War film, Casualties of War (1989). Redacted received a limited release in the United States and grossed less than $1 million against a $5 million budget.

2010s
De Palma's output has slowed since the release of Redacted. In 2012, his film Passion starring Rachel McAdams and Noomi Rapace was selected to compete for the Golden Lion at the 69th Venice International Film Festival but received mixed reviews and was financially unsuccessful.

De Palma's next project was the 2019 thriller Domino. It received generally negative reviews and was released direct-to-VOD in the United States, grossing less than half a million dollars internationally. De Palma has also expressed dissatisfaction with both the production of the film and the final product.

Trademarks and style

Themes
De Palma's films can fall into two categories, his psychological thrillers (Sisters, Body Double, Obsession, Dressed to Kill, Blow Out, Raising Cain) and his mainly commercial films (Scarface, The Untouchables, Carlito's Way, and Mission: Impossible). He has often produced "De Palma" films one after the other before going on to direct a different genre, but would always return to his familiar territory. Because of the subject matter and graphic violence of some of De Palma's films, such as Dressed to Kill, Scarface and Body Double, they are often at the center of controversy with the Motion Picture Association of America, film critics and the viewing public.

De Palma frequently quotes and references other directors' work. Michelangelo Antonioni's Blowup and Francis Ford Coppola's The Conversation plots were used for the basis of Blow Out. The Untouchables finale shoot out in the train station is a clear borrowing from the Odessa Steps sequence in Sergei Eisenstein's The Battleship Potemkin. The main plot from Rear Window was used for Body Double, while it also used elements of Vertigo. Vertigo was also the basis for Obsession. Dressed to Kill was a note-for-note homage to Hitchcock's Psycho, including such moments as the surprise death of the lead actress and the exposition scene by the psychiatrist at the end.

Camera shots
Film critics have often noted De Palma's penchant for unusual camera angles and compositions. He often frames characters against the background using a canted angle shot. Split-screen techniques have been used to show two separate events happening simultaneously. To emphasize the dramatic impact of a certain scene De Palma has employed a 360-degree camera pan. Slow sweeping, panning and tracking shots are often used throughout his films, often through precisely-choreographed long takes lasting for minutes without cutting. Split focus shots, often referred to as "di-opt", are used by De Palma to emphasize the foreground person/object while simultaneously keeping a background person/object in focus. Slow-motion is frequently used in his films to increase suspense.

Personal life
De Palma has been married and divorced three times, to actress Nancy Allen (1979–1983), producer Gale Anne Hurd (1991–1993), and Darnell Gregorio (1995–1997). He has one daughter from his marriage to Hurd, Lolita de Palma, born in 1991, and one daughter from his marriage to Gregorio, Piper De Palma, born in 1996. He resides in Manhattan, New York.

Legacy

De Palma is often cited as a leading member of the New Hollywood generation of film directors, a distinct pedigree who either emerged from film schools or are overtly cine-literate. His contemporaries include Martin Scorsese, Paul Schrader, John Milius, George Lucas, Francis Ford Coppola, Steven Spielberg, John Carpenter, and Ridley Scott. His artistry in directing and use of cinematography and suspense in several of his films has often been compared to the work of Alfred Hitchcock. Psychologists have been intrigued by De Palma's fascination with pathology, by the aberrant behavior aroused in characters who find themselves manipulated by others.

De Palma has encouraged and fostered the filmmaking careers of directors such as Mark Romanek and Keith Gordon, the latter of whom collaborated with him twice as an actor, both in 1980's Home Movies and Dressed to Kill. Filmmakers influenced by De Palma include Terrence Malick, Quentin Tarantino, Ronny Yu, Don Mancini, Nacho Vigalondo, and Jack Thomas Smith. During an interview with De Palma, Quentin Tarantino said that Blow Out is one of his all-time favorite films, and that after watching Scarface he knew how to make his own film. John Travolta's performance as Jack Terry in Blow Out even resulted in Tarantino casting him as Vincent Vega in his 1994 film Pulp Fiction, which would go on to reinvigorate Travolta's then-declining career. 

Critics who frequently admire De Palma's work include Pauline Kael and Roger Ebert. Kael wrote in her review of Blow Out, "At forty, Brian De Palma has more than twenty years of moviemaking behind him, and he has been growing better and better. Each time a new film of his opens, everything he has done before seems to have been preparation for it." In his review of Femme Fatale, Roger Ebert wrote about the director: "De Palma deserves more honor as a director. Consider also these titles: Sisters, Blow Out, The Fury, Dressed to Kill, Carrie, Scarface, Wise Guys, Casualties of War, Carlito's Way, Mission: Impossible. Yes, there are a few failures along the way (Snake Eyes, Mission to Mars, The Bonfire of the Vanities), but look at the range here, and reflect that these movies contain treasure for those who admire the craft as well as the story, who sense the glee with which De Palma manipulates images and characters for the simple joy of being good at it. It's not just that he sometimes works in the style of Hitchcock, but that he has the nerve to."

The influential French film magazine Cahiers du Cinéma has placed five of De Palma's films (Carlito's Way, Mission: Impossible, Snake Eyes, Mission to Mars, and Redacted) on their annual top ten list, with Redacted placing first on the 2008 list. The magazine also listed Carlito's Way as the greatest film of the 1990s.

Julie Salamon has written that critics have accused De Palma of being "a perverse misogynist", to which De Palma has responded with, "I'm always attacked for having an erotic, sexist approach chopping up women, putting women in peril. I'm making suspense movies! What else is going to happen to them?"

His films have also been interpreted as feminist and examined for their perceived queer affinities. In Film Comment "Queer and Now and Then" column on Femme Fatale, film critic Michael Koresky writes that "De Palma's films radiate an undeniable queer energy" and notes the "intense appeal" De Palma's films have for gay critics. In her book The Erotic Thriller in Contemporary Cinema, Linda Ruth Williams writes that "De Palma understood the cinematic potency of dangerous fucking, perhaps earlier than his feminist detractors".

Robin Wood considered Sisters an overtly feminist film, writing that "one can define the monster of Sisters as women's liberation; adding only that the film follows the time-honored horror film tradition of making the monster emerge as the most sympathetic character and its emotional center." Pauline Kael's review of Casualties of War, "A Wounded Apparition", describes the film as "feminist" and notes that "De Palma was always involved in examining (and sometimes satirizing) victimization, but he was often accused of being a victimizer". Helen Grace, in a piece for Lola, writes that upon seeing Dressed to Kill amidst calls for a boycott from feminist groups Women Against Violence Against Women and Women Against Pornography, that the film "seemed to say more about masculine anxiety than about the fears that women were expressing in relation to the film".

David Thomson wrote in his entry for De Palma, "There is a self-conscious cunning in De Palma's work, ready to control everything except his own cruelty and indifference." Matt Zoller Seitz objected to this characterisation, writing that there are films from the director which can be seen as "straightforwardly empathetic and/or moralistic".

His life and career in his own words was the subject of the 2015 documentary De Palma, directed by Noah Baumbach and Jake Paltrow.

Filmography

Short films

Feature films

Music videos

Awards and nominations received by De Palma's films

Books

Citations

General and cited sources 
 Thomson, David (October 26, 2010). The New Biographical Dictionary of Film: Fifth Edition, Completely Updated and Expanded (hardcover ed.). Knopf. .
 Salamon, Julie (1991). Devil's Candy: The Bonfire of the Vanities Goes to Hollywood (hardcover ed.). Houghton. .

Further reading
 Bliss, Michael (1986). Brian De Palma. Scarecrow.
 Blumenfeld, Samuel; Vachaud, Laurent (2001). Brian De Palma. Calmann-Levy.
 Dworkin, Susan (1984). Double De Palma: A Film Study with Brian De Palma. Newmarket.

External links

 
 Senses of Cinema: Great Directors Critical Database
 Photos and discussion around the director
 Literature on Brian De Palma
 Brian De Palma bibliography (via UC Berkeley)

1940 births
Living people
Action film directors
American film directors
American people of Italian descent
American male screenwriters
American writers of Italian descent
Columbia University alumni
English-language film directors
Film producers from New Jersey
Friends' Central School alumni
Giallo film directors
Horror film directors
People of Apulian descent
Sarah Lawrence College alumni
Screenwriters from New Jersey
Venice Best Director Silver Lion winners
Writers from Newark, New Jersey
Postmodernist filmmakers